Since the 1970s, over ninety U.S. banks with  billion or more in assets have failed. The list below is based on assets at the time of failure of banks insured by the Federal Deposit Insurance Corporation.

See also

 List of bank failures in the United States (2008–present)
 List of banks acquired or bankrupted in the United States during the 2007–2008 financial crisis
 Too big to fail

References

External links
 Failed banks since 2000

Failures
Bank failures
United States economic history-related lists